WIGM (1490 AM) is a radio station, licensed to Medford, Wisconsin, United States, that broadcasts a sports format.   The station is currently owned by WIGM, Incorporated, and features programming from CBS Sports Radio.

In February 2019 WIGM changed their format from sports to country, branded as "Kickin' Country" (simulcast on FM translator W296DL Medford).

Previous logo
 (WIGM's logo under previous ESPN Radio affiliation)

References

External links

IGM
Country radio stations in the United States